Bomlitz is a village and a former municipality in the Heidekreis district, in Lower Saxony, Germany. On 1 January 2020, it was merged into the town Walsrode.

Geography

Location 
Bomlitz lies on the Lüneburg Heath in a heavily wooded area. The two rivers, Bomlitz and Warnau run through the municipality.

Parishes 
The municipality of Bomlitz comprised eight localities (Ortschaften): Ahrsen, Benefeld, Bomlitz, Bommelsen, Borg, Jarlingen, Kroge and Uetzingen.

History 
In the fall of 1944, a short-lived satellite camp of Bergen-Belsen concentration camp operated at Bomlitz-Benefeld. Guarded by SS staff, around 600 women were forced to work at the Eibia GmbH gunpowder works.

Politics

Municipal council 
The municipal council (Gemeinderat) of Bomlitz consists of 20 councillors and the mayor (Bürgermeister) who is from the SPD party.
 CDU 8 seats
 SPD 12 seats
(as at the local elections on 10 September 2006)
 Mayor: Michael Lebid

Twin towns 
 Kępice, Poland
 Blainville sur Orne, France.

Parks 
Nearby is the Walsrode Bird Park. It is one of the largest bird parks in the world with an area of 240,000 m². About 4,000 birds of over 700 different species live on the site.

Natural monuments 
In the Eibia local recreation area there are several pre-Christian tumuli.

Sport 

There are 2 large sports clubs in Bomlitz:

 SG Bomlitz-Lönsheide
The Bomlitz-Lönsheide Sports Club (Sportgemeinschaft Bomlitz-Lönsheide) was formed by the merger of Bomlitz Sports Club (Sportverein Bomlitz) and the Uetzingen-Honerdingen Sports Club (Spielgemeinschaft Uetzingen-Honerdingen). The club has 14 specialisations (including football, handball, cycling and swimming).
 SG Benefeld-Cordingen

The Benefeld-Cordingen Sports Club (Sportgemeinschaft Benefeld-Cordingen) has almost 1,200 members and offers a similarly broad spectrum of sports (including football, handball, gymnastics, walking and, since its merger with the Tennisclub Blau-Weiss Bomlitz in 2010, tennis as well).

 Bomlitz has a heated open-air swimming pool with a 50-metre pool, diving board and non-swimmer's and small children's pools.

References

Sources 

 Olaf Mußmann: Bomlitz. Perspektiven der Geschichte. Geiger, Horb am Neckar 1989; 
 Olaf Mußmann: Komplexe Geschichte. Systemtheorie, Selbstorganisation und Regionalgeschichte. Von der Papiermühle zur Pulverfabrik. Ein historischer Längsschnitt der Gemeinde Bomlitz. Universität, Dissertation, Hanover 1994
 Olaf Mußmann: Selbstorganisation und Chaostheorie in der Geschichtswissenschaft. Das Beispiel des Gewerbe- und Rüstungsdorfes Bomlitz 1680–1930. Leipziger Univ.-Verlag, Leipzig 1998; 
 Thorsten Neubert-Preine: Bomlitz. Von der Papiermühle zur Großgemeinde. Herausgeber Stiftung Geschichtshaus Bomlitz, Rückblende Nr. 5, Mai 2010

Walsrode
Heidmark
Former municipalities in Lower Saxony